Yuri Savaroni Batista da Silva (born 2 December 1990), commonly known as Yuri, is a retired Brazilian footballer.

Career statistics

Club

Notes

References

1990 births
Living people
Brazilian footballers
Association football forwards
Santa Cruz Futebol Clube players
Sport Club do Recife players
Tanabi Esporte Clube players
Sportspeople from Recife